Ashleigh Isenbarger (née Grant; born 15 May 1997) is an Australian professional basketball player for the Perry Lakes Hawks of the NBL1 West.

Basketball career

SBL / NBL1 West
Isenbarger made her debut in the State Basketball League (SBL) for the Lakeside Lightning in 2012. In 2015, she earned SBL Most Improved Player honours. In 2018, she helped the Lightning win the championship while earning SBL All-Defensive Five honours. She played for the Lightning in the West Coast Classic in 2020 and then in the NBL1 West in 2021 and 2022. In August 2022, she played her 200th SBL/NBL1 game.

For the 2023 NBL1 West season, Isenbarger joined the Perry Lakes Hawks.

WNBL
Isenbarger's first stint in the Women's National Basketball League (WNBL) came with the West Coast Waves academy during the 2013–14 season.

For the 2015–16 WNBL season, Isenbarger joined the Perth Lynx as a development player. She was elevated to a contracted player for the 2016–17 season.

For the 2017–18 WNBL season, Isenbarger joined the Melbourne Boomers. She earned the Boomers' Most Improved Player award. She returned to the Boomers for the 2018–19 season.

Isenbarger re-joined the Lynx for the 2020 WNBL Hub season and continued on in the 2021–22 season.

Personal life
Isenbarger's husband, Jack Isenbarger, is also a basketball player and has played in the SBL and NBL1 West.

References

External links

SBL stats

1997 births
Living people
Australian women's basketball players
Basketball players from Perth, Western Australia
Centers (basketball)
Forwards (basketball)
Melbourne Boomers players
Perth Lynx players